Climb Ev'ry Mountain is the third studio album released in 1971 by Australian recording artist Judith Durham. The album produced one single, "Climb Ev'ry Mountain"/"What Could Be a Better Way", which was released in April 1971.

The album was re-released on CD and digitally in 2015. It debuted on the ARIA Albums Chart at number 44.

Track listing 
"Do You Believe" (D. Lema, C. Balwin) – 3:10
"There He Is" (Peter Pye) – 3:05
"Kaleidoscope" (Rod McKuen) – 2:30
"Mama Packed a Picnic Tea" (Peter Warne, David Matthews) – 3:45
"Your Heart is Free" (Christian Chevallier, Joan Shakespeare) – 2:45
"I'm Old Fashioned" (Jerome Kern, Johnny Mercer) – 2:30
"What Could Be a Better Way?" (Judith Durham, Ron Edgeworth) - 3:01
"Skyline Pigeon" (Elton John, Bernie Taupin) - 3:27
"The Ones Who Really Care" (Barbara Keith) - 3:24
"It Doesn't Cost Very Much" (Thomas A. Dorsey) - 2:34
"Ferris Wheel" (Barbara Keith) - 1:58
"Climb Ev'ry Mountain" (Richard Rodgers, Oscar Hammerstein II) - 3:26

Charts 
The album's original Go-Set chart position is unknown. Climb Ev'ry Mountain debuted at number 44 in 2015 after the album was re-released on Decca Records.

External links 
 Climb Ev'ry Mountain at Discogs

References 

Judith Durham albums
1971 albums
A&M Records albums
albums produced by Ron Richards (producer)